The 1913–14 British Home Championship was the last British Home Championship played before the First World War. The competition was played between January and April 1914 and won by Ireland with a team that included Patrick O’Connell, Billy Gillespie, Val Harris, Louis Bookman, Samuel Young and Bill Lacey.

1913–14 was the first time Ireland won the competition outright. The Irish had been the tournament's poorest performers over the years, but the previous year had demonstrated potential in beating England for the first time, in a 2–1 win at Windsor Park. Ireland began the 1914 tournament beating Wales 2–1 a in Wrexham on 19 January and then demolished England in England for the first time, winning 3–0 at Ayresome Park in Middlesbrough. Ireland clinched the title on 16 March, following a 1–1 draw with Scotland at Windsor Park, while England's away victory over Wales did not salvage their poor campaign as Scotland would eventually finish as runners up, beating England 3–1 at Hampden Park. It would be six years before the championship was again contested, and it would be with substantially different teams and in a different, increasingly global era of football.

The third-place finish by England represented that nation's lowest ever final position in the competition up to this point.

Table

Results

Winning squad

References

British Home Championship 1914 at Rsssf

External links
Ireland-Champions in 1914

1914 in British sport
1914
1913–14 in Scottish football
1913–14 in English football
Brit
Brit
Ireland national football team (1882–1950)